Uphill is a village in the civil parish of Weston-super-Mare in North Somerset, England, at the southern edge of the town, on the Bristol Channel coast.

History
Bone and stone tools found in caves at Uphill provide evidence of human activity in the Upper Palaeolithic period, and a radiocarbon date of around 28,000 Before Present, which came from a bone point, was the first scientifically derived direct date from the entire British Isles for an artefact of that period (the Aurignacian).

The River Axe enters the Bristol Channel at Uphill where it is sheltered by Brean Down and it is possible that there was a port at Uphill in Roman times but no archaeological evidence has been found for this.

At the time of Domesday Book (1086) the manor of Opopille was in the possession of four knights. 1 serf, 7 villeins and 4 bordars lived and worked here. Ships coming into Uphill fell under the limited jurisdiction of the Port of Bristol, however it was a free port as it did not have the customs officers to collect revenues which were present at larger ports. In 1591 the captured French ship the Gray Honde from Bayonne was brought into Uphill, however; the normal trade from the 16th century was in livestock, brought from South Wales to be fattened on the local rich grassland. During the English Civil War the port was used to bring two regiments, about 1,500 men, of the Royalist Army from South Wales before the Battle of Langport. It continued as a small landing stage for many centuries including the import of coal and iron and the export of local produce. After the Enclosure Act of 1813 a public wharf was constructed for trade and was also used occasionally by passenger excursion ships.

In the late eighteenth century visitors started to come to the area for health reasons. The philanthropist Hannah More convalesced at uphill in 1773 and a few years later Jane Biss was advertising summer accommodation in the village while the landlord of the Ship Inn had a bathing machine for hire. A 'Sea Bathing infirmary' was in operation from 1826 for a short while.

The Bristol to Exeter railway line runs through a deep cutting between Uphill and nearby Bleadon. This cutting is spanned by a high brick bridge known as "Devil's Bridge" and designed by Isambard Kingdom Brunel. The former Bleadon and Uphill railway station served the village from 1871 until 1964.

Uphill was an ancient ecclesiastical parish, and had almost certainly been established as such before the Norman Conquest. It was a member of Winterstoke Hundred, again from probably before 1066. It became a civil parish in 1866, but in 1933 the civil parish was abolished and absorbed into Weston-super-Mare.

Geography
The manor is recorded in Domesday Book as Opopille which derives from the Old English Uppan Pylle meaning "above the creek". The Pill is a tidal creek which joins the River Axe near where the river flows into Weston Bay to the north of Brean Down. The Pill is connected to the Great Uphill Rhyne which drains the moors to the east of the village.

The village is dominated on its southern side by a large hill, the southern slope of which and the quarry at its western end form the Uphill Cliff Site of Special Scientific Interest, notable for its species-rich calcareous grassland. It consists of species-rich calcareous grassland and rock-face situated on Carboniferous Limestone. Steeper banks and knolls in the grassland have a flora which includes orchids, Somerset Hair Grass (Koeleria vallesiana), and Honewort (Trinia glauca), and the Goldilocks Aster (Galatella linosyris) along with several species of butterfly and Weevil (Curculionoidea). There are a range of flowers including cowslip, primrose and green-winged orchid. The Salt marsh has sea barley, slender hare's-ear and sea clover and limestone grassland with Somerset hair-grass, honewort, green-winged and early purple orchids. These attract redshank, dunlin, shelduck, black-tailed godwit, skylark, linnet, rock and meadow pipit.

The Old Church of St Nicholas is situated on the hill and used to serve as a landmark for ships on the Bristol Channel. Also on the hill is a tower, the remains of a windmill. Although sometimes claimed to be medieval its construction date is unknown. It is most likely to be of the 18th century although map evidence suggests that it had gone out of use by 1782.

Links Road, which runs along below the hill, links the village with the beach to the west. Weston General Hospital is at the west end of the village adjacent to the A370 road. The old road to Weston-super-Mare runs northwards past Uphill Manor (which is known locally as Uphill Castle). The Mendip Way long-distance footpath has its western trailhead at Uphill near the wharf.

Religious sites

On top of the hill stands the unroofed Norman Old Church of St Nicholas. It is now in the care of the Churches Conservation Trust.

The present day Church of St Nicholas is situated on lower ground towards the north end of the village.

In addition, a separate Methodist Church is present in the village, located on Uphill Road South.

Public services
Uphill is home to Weston General Hospital. Weston Hospicecare, a hospice providing palliative care to patients from the surrounding area with terminal illnesses, is also based here.

Notes

References

Further reading
These works provide more detailed information discussed in the notes section.
 
 
 
 
 }

External links

Village website
Weston Hospicecare

Ports and harbours of Somerset
Villages in North Somerset
Populated coastal places in Somerset
Weston-super-Mare
Former civil parishes in Somerset